Statistics of Bulgarian National Football Division in the 1939–40 season.

Overview
It was  contested by 10 teams, and ZhSK Sofia won the championship.

League standings

Results

References
Bulgaria - List of final tables (RSSSF)

Bulgarian State Football Championship seasons
Bulgaria
1939–40 in Bulgarian football